Ports Authority may refer to:

 Gambia Ports Authority F.C., football club based in Gambia 	
 Nigerian Ports Authority, football club based in Nigeria 	
 Ports Authority F.C., football club based in Sierra Leone